The following highways are numbered 594:

Canada
Alberta Highway 594
Manitoba Provincial Road 594
 Highway 594 (Ontario)

United States